The People's Committee of North Korea (Chosŏn'gŭl:  북조선인민위원회) was a provisional government governing the Northern portion of the Korean Peninsula from 1947 until 1948.

Established on 21 February 1947 as the successor of the de facto provisional government of the Provisional People's Committee of North Korea, the provisional government was pro-Soviet and ideologically communist. It functioned alongside the Soviet Civil Administration, which served in an advisory role to the provisional government. The committee oversaw the transition towards a people's democratic state in the Soviet-occupied northern Korea known as the Democratic People’s Republic of Korea, which was established on 9 September 1948.

Organization 
The People's Committee of North Korea was organized during the first session of the People's Assembly of North Korea held on 21–22 February 1947. The session decided to transfer the power of the Provisional People's Committee of North Korea to the People's Committee of North Korea, and elected Kim Il-sung as its chairman based on the proposal of the Democratic National United Front head Choe Yong-gon.

The People's Assembly gave authorization to Kim Il-sung to organize the People's Committee.

Dissolution 
The Democratic People's Republic of Korea was proclaimed on September 9, 1948, effectively dissolving the provisional government. Soviet forces departed from North Korea in 1948.

See also 

Soviet occupation of North Korea
Soviet Civil Administration
Korea under Japanese rule
Provisional Government of the Republic of Korea
United States Army Military Government in Korea
People's Republic of Korea
Korean War

References 

Korea
Korea
Politics of North Korea
Government of North Korea
History of North Korea
1946 in North Korea
1947 in North Korea
1948 in North Korea
Allied occupation of Korea
Korea–Soviet Union relations
Korea
Provisional governments